Zameer Haider (born 30 September 1962, Lahore) is a Pakistani former international cricket umpire, belonging to Pakistan. He also played First-class cricket during the 1980s. Occasionally wicket-keeper, Haider was a right-handed batsman and right-arm off-break bowler.

Background and education 
Haider comes from a family of athletes, as his father Syed Khadim Hussain played hockey for Pakistan Railways. Haider studied at Government Mian Iqbal Hussain High School, Garhi Shahu, Lahore, and completed his matriculation in 1976. He later was graduated from Islamia College. Wasim Akram and Aleem Dar were also studying in college at that time.

International umpiring career 
Haider started his domestic cricket umpiring career in 1998 for Pakistan Cricket Board. He made his debut as an umpire in 2006 when he supervised a match played between Pakistan and West Indies at Multan Cricket Stadium. He supervised his first T20I in 2008 when he stood in a match played between Pakistan and Bangladesh at National Stadium, Karachi. He got a contract from Pakistan Cricket Board (PCB) along with Ahsan Raza and Shozab Raza in 2012.

See also
 List of One Day International cricket umpires
 List of Twenty20 International cricket umpires

References

External links

1962 births
Living people
Pakistani cricket umpires
Pakistani One Day International cricket umpires
Pakistani Twenty20 International cricket umpires
Cricketers from Lahore
Government Islamia College alumni